Shchuchyn is a city in Grodno Region, Belarus. It is the administrative center of Shchuchyn District. The population is nearly 15,000 (2010).

History

The first known official written mention of Shchuchyn is recorded in 1436, but its foundation as a settlement dates back to 1537, when 'Shchuchyn was mentioned in the Book of Acts of the Lithuanian Metrica (the Book of Lithuanian vital records), kept in the Governmental archive in Lithuania.

Ownership of Shchuchyn passed from one noble family to another: The Radziwiłł family, then the Drutskiya-Liubetskis, the Scipions, and others ruled Shchuchyn in turn. In the 15th–18th centuries, Shchuchyn became a member of the Lida council of the Vilnius office of voivode. In the first half of the 17th century, Shchuchyn was governed by the outsider marshal of the Lithuanian principality, Scipio de Campo. Shchuchyn was an average-sized privately owned village in terms of population.

A Catholic Monasterial Order was established 1726 in Shchuchyn by the resolution of the Sejm. The Board of Shchuchyn was considered to be one of the biggest in Belarus.

Shchuchyn was subject to ruin and ravage more than once in its history. The biggest was in the time of the North War, after the town was seized by the Swedish king Karl XII. After the third partition of the Polish–Lithuanian Commonwealth in 1795, Shchuchyn became a part of the Russian Empire. In June 1812 Shchuchyn was occupied by French troops. And again in 1915, by the German Kaiser. In 1919 the Red Army attempted to seize Belarusian land by taking and fortifying the Martinkantsy - Shchuchyn - Shchara - lake Vygonovskoe line. However, the superior defence forces of the "Land of Grodnenskaya", together with Poland, forced the Red Army back. In 1939, Western Belarus, together with Shchuchyn, went under the control of the Soviet authorities. In World War II, Shchuchyn was occupied by German troops.

During the Nazi occupation from 25 June 1941 until 13 July 1944 the Nazi forces killed about 2180 Jews from the Shchuchyn ghetto with the majority of them killed on 10(9) May 1942. 

In 1962, Shchuchyn was granted town status.

Air base 

Until the collapse of the Soviet Union Shchuchyn was a home of one of the biggest Soviet air bases with over 5,000 personnel assigned to it in the 1990s. The history of the Soviet air force presence in the city goes back into 1941 with a wing of Polikarpov I-16. The air base hosted different types of the Soviet planes throughout the years, such as IL-28, MiG-15, MiG-19, An-14, MiG-21, MiG-23, MiG-25, and others. Most famously in the early 1990s it was a home of about 40 MiG-25BM defense-suppression aircraft, which represents the vast majority of this modification of MiG-25 ever produced. The base was controlled by the 95th air wing. The base's runway is 2,500 meters long.

Industry 
Important industry: JSC “Shchuchyn plant “Avtoprovod” (found in 1958), JSC "Shchuchyn butter-cheese factory" and a bread factory.

Education 
Primary and secondary education: three primary schools (each school combines grades one through twelve), a vocational technical school (VTS), a gymnasium. Also there are six government run daycare centres.

Demographics

Population of Shchuchyn: 
1833 — 327;
1866 — 1088;
1897 — 1742;
1921 — 1539;
1940 — about 3500; 
1959 — about 6500; 
1970 — 10.3 thousands; 
1991 — 14.4 thousands;
2002 — 16.3 thousands;
2006 — 15.8 thousands;
2009 — 15'042.

Notable people
Onufry Pietraszkiewicz, poet
Fania Bergstein, poet

Climate
The Köppen Climate Classification subtype for this climate is "Dfb" (Warm Summer Continental Climate).

See also
 Grodno Region
 Jewish ghettos in Europe
 List of cities and towns in Belarus
 Polish–Lithuanian Commonwealth
 Soviet Air Forces

References

External links 
Photos on Radzima.org
Photo gallery of the town 
  Slownik Geograficzny Entry: Szczuczyn
Diocese of Grodno. Site of the Roman Catholic Church in Belarus
«Scucin - the city of aviators» Site about Scucin and its long avia history
  

Scucyn
Populated places in Grodno Region
Shchuchyn District
Vilnius Voivodeship
Lidsky Uyezd
Nowogródek Voivodeship (1919–1939)
Soviet Air Force bases
Holocaust locations in Belarus
Populated places established in 1537